Maroga is a genus of moths of the family Xyloryctidae.

Species
 Maroga leptopasta Turner, 1917
 Maroga melanostigma (Wallengren, 1861)
 Maroga paragypsa Lower, 1901
 Maroga sericodes Meyrick, 1915
 Maroga setiotricha Meyrick, 1890

References

 
Xyloryctidae